In 3D computer graphics, a voxel represents a value on a regular grid in three-dimensional space. As with pixels in a 2D bitmap, voxels themselves do not typically have their position (i.e. coordinates) explicitly encoded with their values. Instead, rendering systems infer the position of a voxel based upon its position relative to other voxels (i.e., its position in the data structure that makes up a single volumetric image).

In contrast to pixels and voxels, polygons are often explicitly represented by the coordinates of their vertices (as points). A direct consequence of this difference is that polygons can efficiently represent simple 3D structures with much empty or homogeneously filled space, while voxels excel at representing regularly sampled spaces that are non-homogeneously filled.

Voxels are frequently used in the visualization and analysis of medical and scientific data (e.g. geographic information systems (GIS)). Some volumetric displays use voxels to describe their resolution. For example, a cubic volumetric display might be able to show 512×512×512 (or about 134 million) voxels.

One of the definitions is: 
Voxel is an image of a three-dimensional space region limited by given sizes, which has its own nodal point coordinates in an accepted coordinate system, its own form, its own state parameter that indicates its belonging to some modeled object, and has properties of modeled region.

This definition has the following advantage. If fixed voxel form is used within the whole model it is much easier to operate with voxel nodal points (i.e. three coordinates of this point). Yet, there is the simple form of record: indexes of the elements in the model set (i.e. integer coordinates). Model set elements in this case are state parameters, indicating voxel belonging to the modeled object or its separate parts, including their surfaces.

Etymology 
The word voxel originated analogously to the word "pixel", with vo representing "volume" (instead of pixel's "picture") and el representing "element"; a similar formation with el for "element" is the word "texel".
The term hypervoxel is a generalization of voxel for higher-dimensional spaces.

Rendering 
A volume described as voxels can be visualized either by direct volume rendering or by the extraction of polygon iso-surfaces that follow the contours of given threshold values. The marching cubes algorithm is often used for isosurface extraction, however other methods exist as well.

Both ray tracing and ray casting, as well as rasterisation, can be applied to voxel data to obtain 2D raster graphics to depict on a monitor.

Incremental error rasterisation 

Another technique for voxels involves raster graphics where one simply raytraces every pixel of the display into the scene, tracking an error term to determine when to step. A typical implementation will raytrace each pixel of the display starting at the bottom of the screen using what is known as a y-buffer. When a voxel is reached that has a higher y value on the display it is added to the y-buffer overriding the previous value and connected with the previous y-value on the screen interpolating the color values. There is a major downside to voxel rasterization when transformation is applied which causes severe aliasing. The advantage was the ability to rasterise using cheap integer calculations on a CPU without hardware acceleration.

Outcast, and other 1990s video games employed this graphics technique for effects such as reflection and bump-mapping and usually for terrain rendering. Outcasts graphics engine was mainly a combination of a ray casting (heightmap) engine, used to render the landscape, and a texture mapping polygon engine used to render objects. The "Engine Programming" section of the games credits in the manual has several subsections related to graphics, among them: "Landscape Engine", "Polygon Engine", "Water & Shadows Engine" and "Special effects Engine". Although Outcast is often cited as a forerunner of voxel technology, this is somewhat misleading. The game does not actually model three-dimensional volumes of voxels. Instead, it models the ground as a surface, which may be seen as being made up of voxels. The ground is decorated with objects that are modeled using texture-mapped polygons. When Outcast was developed, the term "voxel engine", when applied to computer games, commonly referred to a ray casting engine (for example the VoxelSpace engine). On the engine technology page of the game's website, the landscape engine is also referred to as the "Voxels engine". The engine is purely software-based; it does not rely on hardware-acceleration via a 3D graphics card.

John Carmack also experimented with Voxels for the Quake III engine. One such problem cited by Carmack was the lack of graphics cards designed specifically for such rendering requiring them to be software rendered.

Comanche was also the first commercial flight simulation based on voxel technology. NovaLogic used the proprietary Voxel Space engine developed for the company by Kyle Freeman (written entirely in Assembly language) to create open landscapes. This rendering technique allowed for much more detailed and realistic terrain compared to simulations based on vector graphics at that time.

 Gallery 

 Data 
A voxel represents a single sample, or data point, on a regularly spaced, three-dimensional grid. This data point can consist of a single piece of data, such as an opacity, or multiple pieces of data, such as a color in addition to opacity. A voxel represents only a single point on this grid, not a volume; the space between each voxel is not represented in a voxel-based dataset. Depending on the type of data and the intended use for the dataset, this missing information may be reconstructed and/or approximated, e.g. via interpolation.

The value of a voxel may represent various properties. In CT scans, the values are Hounsfield units, giving the opacity of material to X-rays. Different types of value are acquired from MRI or ultrasound.

Voxels can contain multiple scalar values, essentially vector (tensor) data; in the case of ultrasound scans with B-mode and Doppler data, density, and volumetric flow rate are captured as separate channels of data relating to the same voxel positions.

While voxels provide the benefit of precision and depth of reality, they are typically large data sets and are unwieldy to manage given the bandwidth of common computers. However, through efficient compression and manipulation of large data files, interactive visualization can be enabled on consumer market computers.

Other values may be useful for immediate 3D rendering, such as a surface normal vector and color.

Technologies to extend voxels into 4 and 5 dimensions of data are under investigation.

 Uses 
Common uses of voxels include volumetric imaging in medicine and representation of terrain in games and simulations. Voxel terrain is used instead of a heightmap because of its ability to represent overhangs, caves, arches, and other 3D terrain features. These concave features cannot be represented in a heightmap due to only the top 'layer' of data being represented, leaving everything below it filled (the volume that would otherwise be the inside of the caves, or the underside of arches or overhangs).

 3D computer graphics software 
 3D-Coat offers a voxel sculpting mode.
 Blender (2.81+) allows one to create a voxel-like effect by Quad Remesh (with Quadriflow algorithm) or Voxel Remesh (with OpenVDB).The Voxel Remesher uses OpenVDB to generate a new manifold mesh from the current geometry. 
 Cinema 4D (R20+) allows one to create a voxel-like effect (with OpenVDB).
 ZBrush uses its voxel-like Unified Skin technology for the DynaMesh and other tools. It makes a smart pixel which is called a "pixol".
 Mega Voxels''' is a free-to-use voxel editor developed by Go Real Games, LLC to design 3D models using voxels.
 Voxel Builder, an online open-source playground based on Babylon.js.

 Computer games 
 3D Dot Game Heroes uses voxels to present retro-looking graphics.
 7 Days to Die is a voxel-based open world survival horror game developed by The Fun Pimps Entertainment.
 Ace of Spades used Ken Silverman's Voxlap engine before being rewritten in a bespoke OpenGL engine.
 Amok uses voxels for its environments.
 Armored Fist 3 is a computer game made by Novalogic that used voxel-based rendering technology.
 Blade Runner is a video game that used voxels to render characters and artifacts.
 Castle Story, a castle building Real Time Strategy game in development, has terrain consisting of smoothed voxels.
 Cloudpunk, a cyberpunk adventure game, is almost entirely voxel-based.
 Comanche series, a series of computer games made by NovaLogic that used the Voxel Space voxel rasterization for terrain rendering.
 Command & Conquer: Tiberian Sun, Command & Conquer: Red Alert 2 and Command & Conquer: Yuri's Revenge are computer games made by Westwood Studios that used voxels to render most vehicles.
 Crysis, as well as Cryengine 2 and Cryengine 3, use a combination of heightmaps and voxels for their terrain systems.
 Cube World, an action role-playing game, features procedurally generated voxel landscapes.
 Delta Force is a computer game made by Novalogic that used the in-house Voxel Space rendering engine.
 Dual Universe is a single-shard universe MMORPG game that uses voxels to build spaceships, civilizations, and space stations.
 EverQuest Next and EverQuest Next: Landmark, cancelled MMORPGs by Sony Online Entertainment, make extensive use of voxels for world creation as well as player generated content
 Hexplore, a multi-player role playing game, uses a voxel engine allowing the player to rotate the isometric rendered playfield.
 Hytale is a RPG Sandbox voxel-based game which gets developed by Hypixel Studios and gets funded by Riot Games, release date is set to 2023 at earliest.
 Master of Orion III uses voxel graphics to render space battles and solar systems. Battles displaying 1000 ships at a time were rendered slowly on computers without hardware graphic acceleration.
 Medieval Engineers is the second voxel-based engineering game by Keen Software House inspired from medieval technology.
 Minecraft is a sandbox video game that uses voxels to store terrain data, but does not use voxel rendering techniques. Instead it uses polygon rendering to display each voxel as a cubic "block".
 Miner Wars 2081 is a 6DOF open world game made by Keen Software House that uses its own VRage voxel rendering engine to let the user deform the terrain of asteroids allowing tunnels to be formed.
 No Man's Sky is a space exploration game consisting of procedurally generated star systems containing explorable planets, moons and asteroids made up of voxels. The voxel engine allows for both terrain destruction and creation.
 Outcast, is a third-person action computer game made by former Belgian video game developer Appeal, with landscapes rendered by a voxel engine.
 Phase Zero is a 2002 unreleased action-shooter video game for Atari Jaguar, with landscapes redered by the engine Voxel Space.
 Planet Coaster is a 2016 construction and management simulation developed and published by Frontier Developments which uses a voxel-based terrain editor.
 Resogun is a 2013 voxel-based side-scrolling shoot 'em up video game developed by Finnish developer Housemarque.
 Roblox uses voxels for terrain.
 Robocraft, a vehicular combat game in which players build combat machines out of voxels and premade components
 ScrumbleShip, a block-building MMO space simulator game in development (as of 2017), renders each in-game component and damage to those components using dozens to thousands of voxels.
 Shadow Warrior and Blood use Build engine for first-person shooter game voxel rendering, instead of sprites, as an option for many of the items pickups and scenery. Duke Nukem 3D has a fan-created pack in a similar style.
 Shattered Steel featured deforming landscapes using voxel technology.
 Sid Meier's Alpha Centauri uses voxel models to render units.
 SkySaga: Infinite Isles is a voxel-based sandbox MMORPG, being developed by Radiant Worlds and published by Smilegate.
 Space Engineers is a voxel-based sandbox game set in space, developed and published by Keen Software House
 Starbase, a voxel-based massively multiplayer online role-playing game set in space, being developed and published by Frozenbyte.
 StarMade, a voxel-based sandbox game set in space, developed and published by Robin "Schema" Promesberger.
 Subnautica, a voxel-based survival game set on planet 4546B, developed and published by Unknown Worlds Entertainment.
 Teardown, a voxel-based game featuring fully destructible environments, developed and published by the studio Tuxedo Labs
 The Sandbox Trove is a voxel-based MMORPG with building elements, developed and published by Trion Worlds.
 Vangers is a computer game uses voxels for its two-level terrain system.
 Vox, released in 2012, is a voxel based exploration/RPG game focused on player generated content.
 Voxatron, a computer game produced by Lexaloffle, is composed and generated fully using voxels.
 Werewolf is a computer game made by Novalogic that used voxel-based rendering technology. It was originally bundled and shipped with the Comanche 2 game although they were two separate games.
 Worms 4: Mayhem uses a voxel-based engine to simulate land deformation similar to the older 2D Worms games.
 Minetest uses them for rendering nodes

 Editors 
While scientific volume visualization does not require modifying the actual voxel data, voxel editors can be used to create art (especially 3D pixel art) and models for voxel based games. Some editors are focused on a single approach to voxel editing while others mix various approaches. Some common approaches are:

 Slice based: The volume is sliced in one or more axes and the user can edit each image individually using 2D raster editor tools. These generally store color information in voxels.
 Sculpture: Similar to the vector counterpart but with no topology constraints. These usually store density information in voxels and lack color information.
 Building blocks: The user can add and remove blocks just like a construction set toy.
There are a few voxel editors available that are not tied to specific games or engines. They can be used as alternatives or complements to traditional 3D vector modeling.
 Extensions 
A generalization of a voxel is the toxel'', or temporal voxel. This is used in the case of a 4D dataset, for example, an image sequence that represents 3D space together with another dimension such as time. In this way, an image could contain 100×100×100×100 toxels, which could be seen as a series of 100 frames of a 100×100×100 volume image (the equivalent for a 3D image would be showing a 2D cross section of the image in each frame). Although storage and manipulation of such data requires large amounts of memory, it allows the representation and analysis of spacetime systems.

See also 
 Maxel – material element
 Pixel – picture element
 Plane partition
 Resel – resolution element
 Sparse voxel octree
 Texel – texture element
 Tixel - tactile element
 Tomography
 Volume mesh
 Volume rendering

References

External links 
 
 Fundamentals of voxelization "Archived"

 
3D computer graphics
3D imaging
Articles containing video clips
Cubes